Ruy López Dávalos (Úbeda, Jaén Province, Spain, 1357 - in exile, Valencia, Spain, 1428), Count of Ribadeo since it was sold by the first count, the Frenchman Pierre de Villaines, who received it from Henry II of Castile on 20 December 1369, Adelantado of Murcia, 1396, Constable of Castile, 1400–1423, during the reigns of kings Henry III of Castile and John II of Castile. He was very attached to king Henry III's uncle, Ferdinand of Antequera, afterwards elected king Ferdinand I of Aragon, king 1412-1416. He was attached then to one of Ferdinand's troublesome sons, Infante Henry of Aragon (1400–1445).

Infante Henry of Aragon's contemptuousness with his cousin king John II of Castile

In November 1420, Infante Henry of Aragon headed a plot in Tordesillas to capture his young cousin, king John II of Castile, (1405–1454), and get himself married to his cousin Catherine, John II's sister. The fact that his father Prince Fernando de Antequera had been promoted to elected king of Aragon in 1412, and the still very extensive properties of his father in Castile, prompted him to impose his (contemptuous) will on his rather quiet cousin, the king John II. Further Prince Henry of Aragon had married king John II of Castile's sister, Catherine, being provided there and then with extensive properties and money which made Prince Henry, probably, to be above everything and everybody around him.

The meddling of king Ferdinand I of Aragon's children, known as the Infantes of Aragon; Henry, Peter, Alfonso (king Alfonso V 1416-1458) and John (later king John II of Aragon, 1458–1479), plus the behavior of their sisters, Catherine, Queen Consort of Castile, and Eleanor of Aragon, Queen of Portugal, seems to have brought havoc to the Iberian Peninsula.

Eldest brother, king Alfonso V, left the Iberian Peninsula around 1430, leaving his wife, Maria of Castile, (1401–1458), the sister of king John II of Castile, and his meddling and impulsive brother, John, later king John II of Aragon, to live in Naples, Italy, doing military expeditions to conquer "manu militari" former fiefs of the Aragonese Crown and leading a sexual life there without bothering at all with his Queen, Marie of Castile, king John II of Castile's sister and having in Naples bastard royal children with a few women from the Italian nobility did not help either.

Sorting out Henry of Aragon by Álvaro de Luna

There was a loyal but ambitious, albeit modest Castilian  nobleman, a bastard from Aragonese nobility stock, known as Álvaro de Luna who helped king John II of Castile to fight hard and many times successfully against his scourging cousins, males and females, in 1423.

They questioned however the nobility and the ancestry of faithful Álvaro, forgetting that the "Trastámara" royal families ruling in Castile and in Aragon then and there, and the questionable grips of feudal power of the now royal family, the Enriquez family, could trace their roots, less than 50 years earlier, 1369, in bastardy, violence and questionable powers, including the assassination of "legal" king Peter of Castile in Montiel, in March 1369. Not to mention their dangerous marriages involving closed endogamy relationships.

To be brief, Alvaro let it be known López Dávalos negotiations with the Muslim subjects of the vassal Kingdom of Granada, quite near of the Murcia territories held by the Constable,  whether they were real or just a political concoctions, to become thus the undisputed  protector of the young king of Castile and getting rid of the close involvement of López Dávalos with the Aragonese cousins of the king. The trick worked and Rui López Dávalos had to go into the Kingdom of Aragon, dying with the weight of a discredited life between 1423 and 1428.

The outcome of the exiled López Dávalos family after 1428

16th century Toledo politician Hernando Dávalos, the son of a certain Ruy López Dávalos and Teresa Vélez de Guevara, grandson of a certain Hernándo López de Avalos, (Dávalos), and  Mª Carrillo y Palomeque, and the great grandson of Count of Ribadeo and Constable of Castile till 1423, Ruy López Dávalos, the great great grandson of Diego López Dávalos who together with brother Pedro López Dávalos came from Mencía Dávalos, daughter of Lope Fernández Dávalos, Mayor of the town of Úbeda, Jaén Province), in the year 1300.

This year 1300 people in Ubeda came from Basque-Navarrese settlers in Andalusia since about the 1230s, the well known family of the López de Haro - Díaz de Haro, lords of Biscay between about 1076 and the middle of the 14th century.

Hernando Dávalos made part of the well documented Toledo "Comuneros" fighting against the extra tax contributions, circa 1518,  asked for by king Charles I of Spain (Holy Roman Emperor Charles V) to bend the wishes of the German Electors in his wishes of becoming a Holy Roman Emperor. His properties in Toledo were seized and sold publicly to pay for the military efforts trying to make them obedient to 18-year-old king Charles, born in Ghent, Flanders, an aspiring, and successful, Holy Roman Emperor.

A few male descendants of the family emigrated earlier to Italy, including Malta island,  around 1430 and became there important people of the nobility for over 400 years or so, using names approaching the Spanish spelling of the name, but no necessarily with the same exact graphical signs. The genealogical descent is as follows:

1. Ruy Lopez d'Avalos, Count of Ribadeo, Constable of Castile (1357–1421), married firstly to Maria Gutierrez de Fontechecha; secondly 1395 to Elvira de Guevara; married thirdly to Constanza de Tovar y Toledo, de Los Senores de tierra de la Reina

1.1. (first marriage), Pietro D'Avalos, Pedro Dávalos in Spanish, Señor de Valhenoso, Avinante, Rosales y Villarrodrigo, married Maria de Orozco Suarez de Figueroa

1.2. Diego D'Avalos, Diego Dávalos in Spanish, Señor de Valhenoso, Villarrodrigo y otros ..., married Leonor de Ayala y Castañeda de los Señores de Escamilla

1.3. Leonor Dávalos, married to Men Rodriguez, Señor de Santisteban del Puerto, later became 1st Conde de Santisteban del Puerto, the ancestors of the Ducal house of Santisteban del Puerto.

1.4. (Second marriage) Diego Dávalos de Guevara, married to Isabel de Castilla y Castro, no issue.

1.5 Giovanni de Guevara, Juan de Guevara, Secreto of Malta island  and Gozo island. In 1460, married Paola Inguanez, Paula Iñiguez????, de los barones malteses de Djar il-Biniet, dei Baroni di Djar il-Bniet., with issue.

Guara, Daguara, etc. are Italian approaches in the manuscripts to try to spell the Basque-Spanish name Guevara.

.

Some references
http://www.fmschmitt.com/travels/spain/Jaen_province/Ubeda
Ruy López Dávalos, adelantado de Murcia y condestable de Castilla, Ubeda Información, nº 468, 28 de marzo de 2009, pags 2 y 3.

1357 births
1428 deaths
14th-century Castilian nobility
15th-century Castilian nobility
People from Jaén, Spain
Counts of Spain
Italian nobility